Transhuman Space (THS) is a role-playing game by David Pulver, published by Steve Jackson Games as part of the "Powered by GURPS" (Generic Universal Role-Playing System) line. Set in the year 2100, humanity has begun to colonize the Solar System. The pursuit of transhumanism is now in full swing, as more and more people reach fully posthuman states.

Transhuman Space was one of the first role-playing games to tackle postcyberpunk and transhumanist themes. In 2002, the Transhuman Space adventure "Orbital Decay" received an Origins Award nomination for Best Role-Playing Game Adventure. Transhuman Space won the 2003 Grog d'Or Award for Best Role-playing Game, Game Line or RPG Setting.

Setting
The game assumes that no cataclysm — natural or human-induced — swept Earth in the 21st century. Instead, constant developments in information technology, genetic engineering, nanotechnology and nuclear physics generally improved condition of the average human life. Plagues of the 20th century (like cancer or AIDS) have been suppressed, the ozone layer is being restored and Earth's ecosystems are recovering (although thermal emission by fusion power plants poses an environmental threat—albeit a much lesser one than previous sources of energy). Thanks to modern medicine humans live biblical timespans surrounded by various artificially intelligent helper applications and robots (cybershells), sensory experience broadcasts (future TV) and cyberspace telepresence. Thanks to cheap and clean fusion energy humanity has power to fuel all these wonders, restore and transform its home planet and finally settle on other heavenly bodies.

Human genetic engineering has advanced to the point that anyone—single individuals, same-sex couples, groups of three or more—can reproduce. The embryos can be allowed to be developed naturally, or they can undergo three levels of tinkering: 
1. Genefixing, which corrects defects; 
2. Upgrades, which boost natural abilities (Ishtar Upgrades are slightly more attractive than usual, Metanoia Upgrades are more intelligent, etc.); and... 
3. Full transition to parahuman status (Nyx Parahumans only need a few hours of sleep per week, Aquamorphs can live underwater, etc.) Another type of human genetic engineering, far more controversial, is the creation of bioroids, fully sentient slave races.

People can "upload" by recording the simulation of their brains on computer disks. The emulated individual then becomes a ghost, an infomorph very easily confused with "sapient artificial intelligence". However, this technology has several problems as the solely available "brainpeeling" technique is fatal to the original biological lifeform being simulated, has a significant failure rate and the philosophical questions regarding personal identity remain equivocal. Any infomorph, regardless of its origin, can be plugged into a  "cybershell" (robotic or cybernetic body), or a biological body, or "bioshell". Or, the individual can illegally make multiple "xoxes", or copies of themselves, and scatter them throughout the system, exponentially increasing the odds that at least one of them will live for centuries more, if not forever.

This is also a time of space colonization. First, humanity (specifically China, followed by the United States and others) colonized Mars in a fashion resembling that outlined in the Mars Direct project. The Moon, Lagrangian points, inner planets and asteroids soon followed. In the late 21st century even some of Saturn's moons have been settled as a base for that planet's Helium-3 scooping operations.

Transhuman Space's setting is neither utopia nor dystopia, however: several problems have arisen from these otherwise beneficial developments. The generation gap has become a chasm as lifespans increase. No longer do the elite fear death, and no longer can the young hope to replace them. While it seemed that outworld colonies would offer accommodation and work for those young ones, they are being replaced by genetically tailored bioroids and AI-powered cybershells. The concept of humanity is no longer clear in a world where even some animals speak of their rights and the dead haunt both cyberspace and reality (in form of infomorph-controlled bioshells or cybershells).

And the wonders of high science are not universally shared — some countries merely struggle with informatization while others suffer from nanoplagues, defective drugs, implants and software tested on their populace. In some poor countries high-tech tyrants oppress their backward people. And in outer space all sort of modern crime thrives, barely suppressed by military forces.

Publication history
After the initial set of GURPS books that were published using the GURPS Lite, later publications such as Transhuman Space by David Pulver were labelled simply "Powered by GURPS" without using the name "GURPS" in the book title. Transhuman Space received a significant amount of supporting publications, and was the largest original background setting that Steve Jackson Games produced in 15 years. Shannon Appelcline noted that by its inclusion of posthuman characters, the book began to show the limits of the GURPS system as it was, which is something that Pulver would address soon thereafter.

Steve Jackson Games has not updated the core book (GURPS Transhuman Space) to 4th edition, although the supplement Transhuman Space: Changing Times provides a path for migrating to 4th edition. It has produced several 4th edition supplements for the setting: Transhuman Space: Bioroid Bazaar, Transhuman Space: Cities on the Edge, Transhuman Space: Martial Arts 2100, Transhuman Space: Personnel Files 2-5, Transhuman Space: Shell-Tech, GURPS Spaceships 8: Transhuman Spacecraft, Transhuman Space: Transhuman Mysteries, and Transhuman Space: Wings of the Rising Sun.

Reception

Reviews
Review in Vol. 20, No. 1 of Prometheus, the journal of the Libertarian Futurist Society.

See also
 Eclipse Phase
 Orion's Arm
 Hard science fiction
 List of GURPS books
 GURPS Basic Set
 Pyramid, a monthly online magazine with GURPS support

References

External links
Transhuman Space Official web site
Review of Transhuman Space at RPGnet
2003 Grog d'Or Announcement

Artificial intelligence in fiction
Augmented reality in fiction
Biopunk
Biorobotics in fiction
Brain–computer interfacing in fiction
Cybernetted society in fiction
Cyborgs in fiction
Fiction about consciousness transfer
Fiction about robots
Fiction about the Solar System
Genetic engineering in fiction
GURPS 3rd edition
GURPS 4th edition
GURPS books
Nanopunk
Nanotechnology in fiction
Postcyberpunk
Prosthetics in fiction
Role-playing game supplements introduced in 2002
Science fiction role-playing games
Steve Jackson Games games
Transhumanism in fiction
Virtual reality in fiction